Baga is a red Portuguese wine grape variety planted primarily in the Bairrada DOC. As a varietal, Baga produces tannic wines with high acidity.

Synonyms
Baga is also known under the synonyms Baga de Louro, Baguinha, Bairrada, Bairrado Tinta, Baya, Carrasquenho, Carrega Burros, Goncalveira, Morete, Moreto, Paga Dividas, Poeirinha, Poeirinho, Povolide, Preiinho, Pretinho, Preto Rifete, Rifete, Rosete, Tinta Bairrada, Tinta Bairradina, Tinta da Bairrada, Tinta de Baga, and Tinta Fina.

See also
List of Portuguese grape varieties

References

Red wine grape varieties